The 2006 Tour de Suisse was the 70th edition of the Tour de Suisse road cycling stage race, which took place from 10 to 18 June 2006.

2004 champion Jan Ullrich overcame a 50-second deficit on the final stage to win the overall title and the yellow jersey, in what became the last race of his career. Koldo Gil and Jörg Jaksche finished second and third, respectively, to complete the podium.
In February 2012 Ulrich was found guilty of a doping offence by the Court of Arbitration for Sport. In consequence all his results gained since May 2005 were removed from his Palmares, including this one. The official website of the race however still states Ullrich as the winner of 2006.

Daniele Bennati won the points classification as the most consistent finisher. Astana-Würth Cycling Team captured the team classification while Michael Albasini captured the King of the Mountains and the intermediate sprints jerseys.

Teams
Twenty-one teams of eight riders started the race:

Route

Stages

Stage 1
10 June – Baden to Baden,

Stage 2
11 June – Bremgarten to Einsiedeln,

Stage 3
12 June – Einsiedeln to Arlesheim,

Stage 4
13 June – Niederbipp to La Chaux-de-Fonds,

Stage 5
14 June – La Chaux-de-Fonds to Leukerbad,

Stage 6
15 June – Fiesch to La Punt,

Stage 7
16 June – St. Moritz to Ascona,

Stage 8
17 June – Ambrì to Ambri,

Stage 9
18 June – Kerzers to Bern,

Final standings

General classification

Points classification 
The Points Classification of the Tour de Suisse is for points awarded for most consistently high finisher of the stages (equivalent to the Tour de France's green jersey). The Sprints Classification is for intermediate sprints.

Mountains classification

Sprint classification 
The Sprints Classification of the Tour de Suisse is for intermediate sprints.  The Points Classification is for points awarded for most consistently high finisher of the stages (equivalent to the Tour de France's green jersey).

Jersey progress

References

External links

 

2006 UCI ProTour
2006
Tour de Suisse